Samuel Dickstein (February 5, 1885 – April 22, 1954) was a Democratic Congressional Representative from New York (22-year tenure), a New York State Supreme Court Justice, and a Soviet spy. He played a key role in establishing the committee that would become the House Committee on Un-American Activities, which he used to attack fascists, including Nazi sympathizers, and suspected communists. In 1999, authors Allen Weinstein and Alexander Vassiliev learned that Soviet files indicate that Dickstein was a paid agent of the NKVD.

Background
 
Dickstein was born on February 5, 1885, into a Jewish family of five children near Vilna in the Russian Empire (now known as Vilnius, Lithuania). His parents were Rabbi Israel Dickstein (died 1918) and Slata B. Gordon (died 1931).  In 1887, his family emigrated to the United States. They settled on the Lower East Side of New York City. Dickstein attended public and private schools, the City College of New York, and in 1906 graduated from New York Law School.

Career

In 1908, Dickstein passed the bar and began private practice in New York with the firm of Hyman and Gross.

In 1911, he entered the Tammany Hall Democratic organization in Manhattan under mentor John F. Ahearn.  From 1911 to 1914, he served as Deputy State Attorney General.  In 1917, he became a New York City Alderman. In 1919, he was elected as an Assemblyman of the New York State Legislature.

Congressional career

In 1922, Dickstein was elected as a Democrat to the Sixty-eighth Congress, defeating Socialist incumbent Meyer London. He was reelected eleven times.  He resigned from Congress on December 30, 1945.

In 1930, Dickstein co-sponsored a bill in condemning religious persecution in the Soviet Union.

Committee on Naturalization and Immigration

By 1931, Dickstein was serving as Chairman on the Committee on Immigration and Naturalization (Seventy-second through Seventy-ninth Congresses).  During his tenure, he became aware of the substantial number of foreigners legally and illegally entering and residing in the US, and the growing Anti-Semitism along with vast amounts of anti-Semitic literature being distributed in the country. This led him to investigate independently the activities of Nazi and other fascist groups in the U.S.

In 1932, Dickstein joined forces with Martin Dies Jr. to outlaw membership in the Communist Party of the USA.

In 1933, he called for congressional investigation into Anarchism, following the failed assassination attempt of U.S. President Franklin Delano Roosevelt by Giuseppe Zangara.

In 1939, Dickstein held hearings on a "Child Refugee Bill" AKA the "Wagner-Rogers Bill" to allow up to 10,000 children under age 14 into the United States during 1939–1940 in addition to normal German quotas.  U.S. Secretary of State Cordell Hull opposed the measure, as did the American Legion, United Daughters of the Confederacy, the Society of Mayflower Descendants, and the Daughters of the American Revolution.  The hearings made clear that the bill's purpose was to save German Jews from "annihilation... a complete pogrom."

McCormack-Dickstein Committee

On January 3, 1934, Dickstein introduced the "Dickstein Resolution" (H.R. #198), which passed in March 1934, to establish a "Special Committee on Un-American Activities Authorized to Investigate Nazi Propaganda and Certain Other Propaganda Activities" or "McCormack-Dickstein Committee" (later, the "Dies Committee" and later "House Un-American Activities Committee").

Its mandate was to get "information on how foreign subversive propaganda entered the U.S. and the organizations that were spreading it."

From 1934 to 1937, this Special Committee, with John William McCormack (D-MA) as chairman and Dickstein  as vice-chairman, held public and private hearings and collected testimony filling 4,300 pages, and it was replaced with a similar committee that focused on pursuing communists. Its records are held by the National Archives and Records Administration as records related to HUAC.

One of the first investigations by the Special Committee was the "Business Plot", an alleged 1933 political conspiracy, which, according to retired Marine Corps Major General Smedley Butler, wealthy businessmen were plotting to create a fascist veterans' organization with Butler as its leader and stage a coup d'état to overthrow President Franklin D. Roosevelt.  In 1934, Butler testified before the Special Committee about his claims.  No one was prosecuted. Nonetheless, the Special Committee "delet[ed] extensive excerpts relating to Wall Street financiers including Guaranty Trust director Grayson Murphy, J. P. Morgan, the Du Pont interests, Remington Arms, and others allegedly involved in the plot attempt. (Even in 1975, a full transcript of the hearings could not be traced.)" 

At the time of the incident, news media at first reported on the plot earnestly, then quickly changed course and dismissed the plot. For instance, The New York Times newsroom gave the plot front-page coverage until an editorial characterized it as a "gigantic hoax". Historians have found no evidence for the existence of the plot beyond Butler's claims.

Throughout the rest of 1934, the Special Committee conducted hearings, bringing before it most of the major figures in the U.S. fascist movement. Dickstein, who proclaimed as his aim the eradication of all traces of Nazism in the U.S., personally questioned each witness. His flair for dramatics and sensationalism, along with his sometimes exaggerated claims, continually captured headlines across the nation and won him much public recognition.

By 1935, the Special Committee had helped publicize that the Friends of New Germany (AKA the "German American Bund") of Fritz Julius Kuhn and the "Silver Shirts" of William Dudley Pelley were supporting Nazi Germany but within existing laws.

In 1937, Dickstein sought for continued House investigation but lost control to Martin Dies Jr.

It has been reported that while Dickstein served on this committee and the subsequent Special investigation Committee, he was paid $1,250 a month by the Soviet NKVD, which hoped to get secret congressional information on anti-communists and pro-fascists. It is unclear whether he actually passed on any information.

Later the same committee was renamed the House Committee on Un-American Activities when it shifted attention to Communist organizations and was made a standing committee in 1945. Following the 1938 German takeover of Austria, Dickstein attempted to introduce legislation that would allow unused refugee quotas to be allocated to those fleeing Hitler.

Democratic leaders in the House distrusted Dickstein. They were unaware of his spying or his bribery, but they did know he brutally browbeat and threatened witnesses, grossly exaggerating evidence, and they removed him from membership on the committee.

In September 1945, not long before stepping down from office, Dickstein called the Dies Committee's investigations into Hollywood "a lot of ballyhoo" about an industry that is almost "100 per cent American" and also asserted that "the alien problem is dying away."

NKVD espionage

Peter Duffy wrote:   An Austrian working for the Soviets approached him and asked for help in securing American citizenship. Dickstein told the man that the quota for Austrian immigrants was filled but for $3,000 he would see what he could do. Dickstein said he had "settled dozens" in a similarly illegal fashion, according to the NKVD memo on the meeting. Moscow concluded that Dickstein was "heading a criminal gang that was involved in shady businesses, selling passports, illegal smuggling of people, [and] getting citizenship."      In his 2000 book The Haunted Wood, writer Allen Weinstein wrote that documents discovered in the 1990s in Moscow archives showed Dickstein was paid $1,250 a month from 1937 to early 1940 by the NKVD, the Soviet spy agency, which hoped to get secret Congressional information on anti-Communist and pro-fascist forces as well as supporters of Leon Trotsky. According to Weinstein, whether Dickstein provided useful intelligence is not certain; when he left the Committee the Soviets dropped him from the payroll. Dickstein also unsuccessfully attempted to expedite the deportation of Soviet defector Walter Krivitsky, while the Dies Committee kept him in the country.

Duffy stated:  Dickstein denounced the Dies Committee at NKVD request ("a Red-baiting excursion") and gave speeches in Congress on Moscow-dictated themes. He handed over "materials on the war budget for 1940, records of conferences of the budget subcommission, reports of the war minister, chief of staff, etc." according to an NKVD report.    The Boston Globe stated: "Dickstein ran a lucrative trade in illegal visas for Soviet operatives before brashly offering to spy for the NKVD, the KGB's precursor, in return for cash."  Sam Roberts, in The Brother: The Untold Story of the Rosenberg Case, wrote that "Not even Julius Rosenberg knew that Samuel Dickstein had been on the KGB's payroll."  Kurt Stone wrote that Dickstein "was, for many years, a 'devoted and reliable' Soviet agent whom his handlers nicknamed Crook." Joe Persico wrote, "The files document Soviet spying by Representative Samuel Dickstein of New York, so greedy that his handlers gave him the code name Crook."

New York Supreme Court justice

Following his time in Congress, Dickstein served as a justice of the New York State Supreme Court until his death in 1954.

Death

Dickstein died age 69 on April 22, 1954, in New York City.  He was buried at the Union Field Cemetery, Queens NY.

Legacy 

A one-block section of Pitt Street, between Grand Street and East Broadway in the Lower East Side of Manhattan, is named Samuel Dickstein Plaza. There has been a push to rename the street, but  it has been unsuccessful.

See also

 List of Jewish members of the United States Congress

References

External links 

 
 Library of Congress Photo of Dickstein with Paul Whiteman, Caroline O'Day, and James H. Gildea (March 15, 1927)
 
 "Samuel Dickstein", Spartacus Educational.

1885 births
1954 deaths
People from Vilnius County
People from Vilna Governorate
American people of Lithuanian-Jewish descent
Emigrants from the Russian Empire to the United States
Jewish members of the United States House of Representatives
New York Supreme Court Justices
American spies for the Soviet Union
New York City Council members
Democratic Party members of the New York State Assembly
Democratic Party members of the United States House of Representatives from New York (state)
20th-century American judges
20th-century American politicians